"Immortalized" is a song by American heavy metal band Disturbed, from their sixth studio album Immortalized. It was released on June 29, 2015, as a promotional single for the album. The song was also made available as a downloadable content for the video game, Rock Band 4, on January 12, 2016.

Track listing

Personnel 
 David Draiman – lead vocals, background vocals
 Dan Donegan – all guitars, Ebow, keyboards, bass, background vocals
 Mike Wengren – drums, percussion, background vocals
Kevin Churko – producer, engineer, mixer

Charts

References 

2015 songs
2015 singles
Disturbed (band) songs
Reprise Records singles
Song recordings produced by Kevin Churko
Songs written by Dan Donegan
Songs written by David Draiman
Songs written by Mike Wengren
Songs written by Kevin Churko